After The Third Pin (stylized as After The Thi3d Pin) is the third studio album from the British industrial music/hard rock band Sunna. The album was released on 3 October 2011 in the United States and the United Kingdom on an independent label.

Background
On 12 January 2011, Sunna announced their third album would be released in late March 2011. They also released the official Artwork and Track listing, which were posted on Sunna's official Facebook page.

It was revealed on 26 June 2011 that the album will be released on 3 October 2011.

The album was released on 3 October 2011 and was met with much positive feedback from Sunna's hardcore fanbase.

Track listing 
All songs written and composed by Jon Harris and Ian MacLaren.

Notes

External links
Official Website
Sunna on Twitter

2011 albums
Sunna (band) albums